"Diacrisia" porthesioides is a moth of the family Erebidae. It is found in Sikkim.

References

Moths described in 1910
Arctiina